Yun Po-sun (or  ; August 26, 1897 – July 18, 1990) was a South Korean politician and activist who served as the second president of South Korea from 1960 to 1962. He was the only president of the parliamentary Second Republic of Korea.

Having entered politics after World War II, Yun served as Secretary to Korea's Chief of Staff in 1947; and was Mayor of Seoul in 1948. He served as Commerce Minister for the newly liberated Korea from 1949 to 1950. In 1955, Yun helped establish the South Korean Democratic Party. He was forced to resign the presidency by Park Chung-hee as a result of the May 16 coup in 1961.

Early life
Yun Po-sun was born in Dunpo-myeon, Asan, South Chungcheong Province in 1897. He was a son of Yun Chi-so (윤치소, 尹致昭, 1871–1944) and Lady Yi Beom-suk (이범숙, 李範淑, 1876–1969). Yun Chiso is the second son of Yun Yeong-ryeol (윤영렬;尹英烈). Yun Yeong-ryeol is an 8th generation descendant of the prominent Joseon scholar-official Yun Doo-su (윤두수;尹斗壽). Yun studied in the United Kingdom, graduating with a Master of Arts from the University of Edinburgh in 1930. He returned to Korea in 1932.

Political career
Yun entered politics in 1945 following Gwangbokjeol (Liberation Day). The first Doctor of Philosophy from Princeton University in Korea, as well as first President of South Korea, Dr. Syngman Rhee, was his mentor. By 1947, Yun was serving as Secretary to the Korean Chief of Staff. In 1948, Rhee appointed Yun to the position of mayor of Seoul. A year later, he was made Minister of Commerce and Industry. However, Yun soon began to disagree with Rhee's authoritarian policies.

While serving as president of the Red Cross Society, he was elected to the National Assembly in 1954. A year later, he co-founded the opposition South Korean Democratic Party. In 1959, he became a representative to the Supreme Council of the Democratic Party.

Presidency (1960-62)
Rhee's government was ousted by a student-led, pro-democracy uprising in 1960; and Yun was elected president by the newly elected parliament on August 13, with Chang Myon as Prime Minister. In response to the authoritarian excesses of Rhee's regime, South Korea had switched to a parliamentary system; thus, Yun actually served merely as a figurehead. 

Following Park Chung Hee's coup in 1961, Yun stayed in his post in order to provide some legitimacy to the new regime, but resigned on March 22, 1962. In the following years, Yun received suspended sentences several times for anti-government activities. He opposed Park's authoritarian rule and ran for president twice, in 1963 and 1967, losing each time.

Yun retired from active politics in 1980 and focused his life on cultural activities until his death on July 18, 1990.

Awards
 Grand Order of Mugunghwa
 In-Cheon Cultural Award

See also
Yun Chi-ho
Yun Chi-Oh
Yun Chi-Young
Chang Myon
Chang Chun-ha
August 1960 South Korean presidential election
1963 South Korean presidential election
1967 South Korean presidential election

References

Further reading
 "Road of Thorns; The National Salvation"; autobiography; (구국의 가시밭길)》 (1967)
 "Select the Days of Lonely"; (외로운 선택의 나날들)》 (1991)

External links

 Official website 
 Papyeong Yun clan website
 Yun Posun at Heonjeonghoe 
 Yun Posun at Encyclopedia of Korean Culture 

 
1897 births
1990 deaths
People from South Chungcheong Province
Presidents of South Korea
South Korean civil rights activists
Korean independence activists
Government ministers of South Korea
Alumni of the University of Edinburgh
South Korean democracy activists
Kim Kyu-sik
Leaders ousted by a coup
Democratic Party (South Korea, 1955) politicians
South Korean anti-communists
South Korean Presbyterians
Korean revolutionaries
Liberal Party (South Korea) politicians
Mayors of Seoul
Korean nationalists